The Titanes de Morovis (Morovis Titans) were a professional basketball team from Morovis, Puerto Rico, which played in the country's top pro basketball league, the BSN. They won their only national championship in 1987, defeating the 1986 champions Polluelos de Aibonito, 4 games to 3.

Players
Notable former Titanes players include Wesley Correa, Mario Butler, and Mario Sanchez Rivera, the three of whom led the Titanes to the 1987 national title.

References

BSN teams